The men's handball tournament at the 2015 Pan American Games in Toronto, Canada, was held at the Exhibition Centre (in Hall B) from July 17 to 25.

For these Games, the men competed in an 8-team tournament. The teams were grouped into two pools of four teams each for a round-robin preliminary round. The top two teams in each group advanced to a single elimination bracket.

Argentina were the defending champions from the 2011 Pan American Games in Guadalajara, defeating Brazil, 26–23 in the final. The two teams faced each other again in the 2015 final, this time with Brazil the victor, 29-27 in extra time.

The tournament determined one direct qualifier for the 2016 Summer Olympics in Rio de Janeiro, Brazil, and one entrant in the Olympic Qualification Tournament.  Because the Olympic host nation, Brazil, won, the runner up (Argentina) qualified directly for the Olympics and the third-place team (Chile) earned a spot in the Olympic Qualification Tournament.

Qualification
A total of eight men's teams qualified to compete at the games. The top three teams at the South American and Central American and Caribbean Games qualified, along with the host nation Canada. The United States and Uruguay competed against one another in a home/away playoff for the last spot in the tournament. The fourth placed team in the Central American and Caribbean Games both declined to compete in the respective tournaments.

Summary

Last chance qualification tournament

Rosters

At the start of tournament, all eight participating countries had up to 15 players on their rosters.

Draw
The draw for the competition took place on March 15, 2015 in Montevideo, Uruguay.

Results
The official detailed schedule was revealed on April 26, 2015.

All times are Eastern Daylight Time (UTC−4)

Preliminary round

Group A

Group B

Classification round

Semi-finals

Seventh place match

Fifth place match

Medal round

Semi-finals

Bronze medal match

Gold medal match

Final ranking

Statistics

Top scorers

Top goalkeepers

References

Handball at the 2015 Pan American Games